Melaleuca beardii is a plant in the myrtle family, Myrtaceae and is endemic to the south-west of Western Australia. It is similar to a number of other Western Australian melaleucas such as M. trichophylla with its purple pom-pom flower heads but unlike others, the tips of its leaves are rounded rather than pointed.

Description

The flowers are a shade of pink to purple and arranged in heads on the ends of branches which continue to grow after flowering, sometimes also in the upper leaf axils. The stamens are arranged in bundles of five around the flower, with 8 to 13 stamens in each bundle. The clusters do not form a football shape as in some similar melaleucas.

Taxonomy and naming
Melaleuca beardii was first formally described in 1999 by Lyndley Craven and Brendan Lepschi in Australian Systematic Botany from a specimen collected near Carnamah. The specific epithet (beardii) is in honour of John Stanley Beard, an Australian ecologist.

Distribution and habitat
This melaleuca occurs in the Arrino and Gunyidi districts in the Avon Wheatbelt and Geraldton Sandplains biogeographic regions where it grows in sand on sandplains.

Conservation status
Melaleuca beardii is listed as "not threatened" by the Government of Western Australia Department of Parks and Wildlife.

References 

beardii
Myrtales of Australia
Plants described in 1999
Endemic flora of Western Australia
Taxa named by Lyndley Craven